Parsell is a surname. Notable people with the surname include:

Stuart Parsell (1928–2015), American football coach and college athletics administrator
T. J. Parsell (born 1960), American writer, filmmaker, and human rights activist